The Bradford City Police (Previously the Bradford Borough Police before 1897) was the municipal police department of the city of Bradford, West Yorkshire, England, UK.

History

Bradford Borough Charter was granted in 1847, and Bradford Corporation acquired all the statutory powers from the old Municipal Corporation. In 1848, the Bradford Borough Police was amalgamated, with a Borough HQ No. 24-26 Swaine Street. 
1854 Southgate, Great Horton
1859 Reservoir Lodge, Church St Manningham
1859 Manchester Rd/ Mill St
1859 Wakefield Rd/ Rutland St East Bowling

Bradford was granted city status in 1897.

During the Second World War, many places of worship were turned into auxiliary stations for the Bradford City Police, such as Greenhill Methodist Church, which was later demolished and the site it was on is now occupied by Eccleshill Library.

By 1968, all of the other police forces within the traditional county of West Yorkshire had merged to become the West Yorkshire Constabulary. Only Leeds and Bradford remained independent until they too, were merged into the new West Yorkshire Police Service, six years' later in 1974.

Divisional structure
For operational purposes, Bradford Police was divided into three divisions. The force headquarters was in Bradford City Hall. The divisions with their associated stations and divisional identifiers were:

Special Service
Traffic Division.
Underwater Search & Rescue Team.
Police Dog Section.

Transport
 Morris Eight 1935–1948
 Ford Anglia 1939–1967
 Morris Minor 1948–1971
 Ford Zodiac 1951–1972
 Mini 1959–1974
 Rover P6 2000 1963–1973
 Hillman Imp 1963–1974
 Ford Transit 1965–1974
 Ford Escort 1968–1974
 Rover P6 3500 1968–1974
 Austin Maxi 1969–1974
 Land Rover Range Rover Classic 1970–1974

References

Local government in Bradford
Defunct police forces of England
History of Bradford